The Ducati 125 T (Turismo) and 125 TV (Turismo Veloce) were single cylinder, four-stroke OHV motorcycles built by Ducati from 1956 to 1960, featuring a double downtube full cradle steel frame and full-width drum brakes.

The 125 T sold in London for £181 13 s. 10 d. (inflation adjusted to £  currently) and the 125 TV was £187 2 s. 6 d. (£  currently).

Ducati's success in the year these models were released, selling over 10,000 units in 1956 (a 3.5% market share), would be unmatched until 1992.

See also
List of motorcycles of the 1950s

References

125 TV
Standard motorcycles
Motorcycles introduced in the 1950s
Single-cylinder motorcycles